Ashleigh Cummings  is an Australian actress. She became known for her role as Robyn Mathers in Tomorrow, When the War Began. The film, based on the book of the same name, earned Cummings a nomination for Best Young Actor at the 2010 Australian Film Institute Awards. Cummings is also known for her roles as Dorothy Williams in ABC1's Miss Fisher's Murder Mysteries, as Debbie Vickers in Puberty Blues, and Vic McQueen in NOS4A2.

Early life
Cummings was born in Jeddah, Saudi Arabia, where her Australian parents lived and worked. She moved to Australia with her family when she was 12 years old. From the age of two, Cummings trained as a ballet dancer. When she was 14 she joined the Brent Street School of Performing Arts, where she learned dance and acting. Cummings then attended Wenona School in North Sydney, where she graduated in 2010. She also attended the film and television school Screenwise. Cummings studied philosophy at university between acting roles.

Career
Cummings appeared as a dancer in Darren Ashton's Razzle Dazzle: A Journey into Dance in 2007. She went on to star as Ally Sheppard in Green Fire Envy a project that was produced by the Participate Film Academy. Cummings' next projects were a role in the television film Dream Life and a guest stint in soap opera Home and Away.

In September 2009, it was announced Cummings had joined the cast of Tomorrow, When the War Began, a film based on the John Marsden book of the same name. Cummings learned how to ride dirt bikes and operate AK-47 assault rifles before filming began. She also sat her Year 11 exams early and missed the first part of Year 12, while shooting the film. Cummings earned a nomination for Best Young Actor at the 2010 Australian Film Institute Awards for her portrayal of Robyn Mathers.

From September 2010, Cummings appeared in the Sydney Theatre Company's production of Our Town. The actress went on to appear in episodes of Rescue Special Ops, Underbelly: Razor and Dance Academy in 2011. She was then cast as Dorothy "Dot" Williams in ABC1's Miss Fisher's Murder Mysteries, a drama series based on Kerry Greenwood's Phryne Fisher historical mysteries. Dorothy is "a conservative working-class Catholic" who becomes Phryne's assistant and companion.

In March 2012, it was announced that Cummings had been cast as Debbie Vickers in the television adaptation of Puberty Blues. Cummings read the novel before her audition and she revealed that she was surprised at the content. Cummings stated: "In terms of the sexual nature of it, I wasn't aware of a lot of that and I've learnt so much (doing this movie)." To prepare for the role of Debbie, Cummings took surfing lessons. Cummings went overseas for three weeks to work as a volunteer in South-East Asia, before she returned to film the second series of Miss Fisher's Murder Mysteries. For her roles in Miss Fisher's Murder Mysteries and Puberty Blues, Cummings received a nomination for Most Popular Actress at the Logie Awards.

Cummings recorded vocals for Dan Webb's debut album Sandstorm, released in 2014. She also starred in Rhys Graham's first feature film Galore as Billie. Cummings received a nomination for Best Performance by a Young Actor at the Film Critics Circle of Australia Awards for her role in Galore. In 2015, Cummings appeared in the television miniseries Gallipoli as Celia. She also stars in the remake of the 1981 film Goodbye Pork Pie. In 2016, Cummings won the Heath Ledger Scholarship awarded by Australians in Film to study at the Stella Adler Studio of Acting and the Ivana Chubbuck Studio in Los Angeles. Cummings has a lead role in Hounds of Love. She was also cast as Cheryl Miller in Westside, the prequel series to Outrageous Fortune.

Cummings plays Pippa in The Goldfinch, a film adaptation of Donna Tartt's novel of the same name. She also appears in the lead role of Vic McQueen in AMC horror series NOS4A2.

Filmography

Film

Television

Awards and nominations

References

External links

1992 births
Living people
21st-century Australian actresses
Australian child actresses
Australian film actresses
Australian television actresses
People from Jeddah